James Dearden (born 14 September 1949) is an English film director and screenwriter, the son of Scottish actress Melissa Stribling and English film director Basil Dearden. He directed nine films between 1977 and 2018. His film Pascali's Island was entered into the 1988 Cannes Film Festival.

For writing the screenplay for Fatal Attraction (1987), Dearden received a nomination for the Academy Award for Best Adapted Screenplay.

Dearden is married to British actress Annabel Brooks.

Filmography
 The Contraption (1977)
 Panic (1978)
 Diversion (1980)
 The Cold Room (1984)
 Fatal Attraction (1987) (screenplay, based on Diversion; directed by Adrian Lyne)
 Pascali's Island (1988)
 A Kiss Before Dying (1991)
 Rogue Trader (1999)
 Belle du Seigneur (2012)
 Christmas Survival (2018)

Stage
 Fatal Attraction (2014)

References

External links

1949 births
Living people
English film directors
English screenwriters
English male screenwriters
Writers from London
English people of Scottish descent